Skoutari is a village and a former municipality in the Serres regional unit, Greece. Since the 2011 local government reform it is part of the municipality Serres, of which it is a municipal unit. The municipal unit has an area of 90.159 km2. Population 5,621 (2011). The first villagers arrived from Minor Asia as refugees in October 1922. On 15 August 1924, the day of The Assumption of Mary into Heaven, refugees from Skoutari from Northern Thrace began, and finally settled in the region of today's village. That way the village took its name.

References

 Το Σκουτάριον - Σκούταρι Ανατολικής Θράκης, μελέτη Β.Γιαννογλούδη

Populated places in Serres (regional unit)

bg:Сяр (дем)
el:Δήμος Σκουτάρεως